List of Prokaryotic names with Standing in Nomenclature (LPSN) is an online database that maintains information on the naming and taxonomy of prokaryotes, following the taxonomy requirements and rulings of the International Code of Nomenclature of Prokaryotes. The database was curated from 1997 to June 2013 by Jean P. Euzéby. From July 2013 to January 2020, LPSN was curated by Aidan C. Parte.

In February 2020, a new version of LPSN was published as a service of the Leibniz Institute DSMZ, thereby also integrating the Prokaryotic Nomenclature Up-to-date service.

References

External links

List of Prokaryotic names with Standing in Nomenclature
International Journal of Systematic and Evolutionary Microbiology (IJSEM)
Home Pages of Culture Collection in the World

Online taxonomy databases